is an architect from Japan, known for his modern-style buildings. His work includes projects in other countries. He is the principal architect at Hiroshi Naito Architect & Associates in Tokyo. He is Professor emeritus at the University of Tokyo and President of Tama Art University

Life and career
 
Naito was born in 1950 in Yokohama, Japan.  He received a M.Arch from Graduate School of Waseda University. He was chief architect at Fernand Higueras in Madrid, Spain, from 1976 to 1978, and worked at Kikutake Architects in Tokyo from 1979 to 1981. Naito established Naito Architect & Associates in 1981.

Naito designed a "dog cooler" for Spitz.

Works
 Toba Sea-Folk Museum, Toba, Mie, 1992
 Chihiro Art Museum, Azumino, Nagano, 1993 and 1993–97
 Autopolois Art Museum, Hita, Oita, 1993
 Fishing Museum, Shima, 1994
 Wohn- und Atelierhaus, 1995 and 1997
 Ushibuka Fisherman's Wharf, Amakusa, Kumamoto, 1997
 Makino Botanical Garden main building and exhibition building, 1999
 Koga Municipal Park visitor center, Koga, Ibaraki, 1999
 Botanisches Museum, 2000
 Bashamichi Station, Yokohama, Kanagawa, 2004
 Shimane Arts Center, Masuda, Shimane, 2005
 Bethlehem Library, Medellin, Colombia, 2008
 Hyūgashi Station, Hyūga, Miyazaki, 2008
 Kōchi Station, Kōchi, Kōchi, 2009
 Asahikawa Station, Asahikawa, Hokkaido, 2011

References
Notes

Further reading
Hiroshi Naito
NAITO, Yoshida, Nobuyuki, Japan Architect #46: Hiroshi Naito, A Special edition devoted to the some 20 years of his career, Publisher: Japan Architect. Year: 2002, Tokyo, Book Id: 50431

External links

Naito Architect & Associates 

1950 births
Living people
Japanese architects
Waseda University alumni
Academic staff of the University of Tokyo
People from Yokohama